RK Warriors Nemila is a Bosnian rugby club based in Nemila. In the 2012–2013 season, they combined with Tešanj RK.

References

External links
RK Warriors Nemila (in Bosnian)

Bosnia and Herzegovina rugby union teams